János Bartl (1878–1958), a descendant of a German craftsman family which had emigrated to Hungary, was one of the most important magic supply dealers of the pre-war era.

Biography 
His parents called him Johann, but on his Hungarian birth certificate it said János.  After attending school, he learned the craft of book-binding in his home town. As a journeyman he worked in Budapest, Vienna, Dresden, Munich, and Hamburg in large workshops. By 1902 Bartl was employed as a book cover gilder.

He  studied magic books in his free time and by 1909 he was performing professionally. He travelled predominantly through German towns under the name of "Aradi" and later under his own name. Around 1910 he opened a magic school, which  called "Academy for Modern Magic Art", but it was apparently not very successful.  A short time after the family arrival in Hamburg, they  rented several rooms in an adjacent house  for the production and sale of magic items. The store took off quickly offering not only magic tricks and books but also gag gifts, puzzle games, fireworks, and picture postcards.
 
From 1919 to 1924 he joined Carl Willmann in the Vereinigte Zauberapparate Fabrik Bartl & Willmann (United Magic Instruments Factory of Bartl & Willmann). Bartl was still offering Willmann's products for years afterwards in his sale lists.

Bartl shipped his  products to all parts of the world. Dinardi, Okito, Chefalo, Cortini, Kassner, and other stars used Bartl's inventions.

References 

1878 births
1958 deaths
German magicians
People from Zrenjanin
Businesspeople from Hamburg
Austro-Hungarian emigrants to Germany